The 2011 Staffordshire Moorlands District Council election is took place on 5 May 2011 to elect members of Staffordshire Moorlands District Council in England. This was on the same day as other local elections.

After the election, the composition of the council was:
Conservative 26
Independent 10
Labour 7
Moorlands Democratic Alliance 5
Liberal Democrat 4
Staffordshire Independent Group 3
UKIP 1

Ward results
The candidates highlighted in bold were elected to each ward.

References

 2011 election results
 2007 election results

2011 English local elections
2011
2010s in Staffordshire